Gathright Dam is an earthen and rolled rock-fill embankment dam on the Jackson River  north of Covington, Virginia. The dam serves flood control and recreational purposes and is operated by the U.S. Army Corps of Engineers.

This allows the dam to manage the temperature and flow of water released downstream. This helps mitigate some of the negative environmental effects posed by the dam and manage fisheries downstream.

History and construction

The Gathright Dam was authorized by Congress with the Flood Control Act of 1946 to provide flood protection of industrial, commercial and residential properties along the Jackson and James Rivers, with immediate impact on Covington, Virginia. Benjamin Cline Moomaw, Jr., a Virginian businessman who was influential in gaining approval for the project and is known locally as "the Father of the Gathright Dam" is the namesake for the lake. The dam itself is named after Thomas Gathright, who owned the land that was flooded by the reservoir.

Because of setbacks though, construction did not begin until 1974. The dam was finished in 1979 and that December, Lake Moomaw began to fill. The reservoir was filled by April 1982. Filling of the reservoir displaced the small town of Greenwood which had been located at what is now the southern part of Lake Moomaw.

Environmentalists and the EPA challenged the plan for construction on grounds that the scenic Kincade Gorge and important historical and archaeological sites would be destroyed by the lake. Contesting parties suggested that the dam was constructed for the benefit of the Westvaco paper plant downstream that relied on a regular flow of water to operate.

Instability concerns

In May 2009, the U.S. Army Corps of Engineers (USACE) inspected the Gathright Dam as part of Screening Portfolio Risk Analysis and routine inspections. Later in the year on September 2, the USACE assigned the dam a Safety Action Classification (DSAC) II which is defined as "Urgent (Unsafe or Potentially Unsafe)".

Because of this rating, the USACE has implemented risk reduction measures which include increased monitoring, updating emergency operation plans and reducing the water level in the reservoir. Throughout 2010, the USACE conducted safety exercises with local/state officials, conduct a series of investigations on the dam, update inundation mapping and reevaluate the DSAC status.

References

External links 

 USACE - Gathright Dam Action Plan
 USACE - Gathright Dam Reservoir Status
 Gathright Historic - USACE photo album from construction
 Lake Moomaw Water Level

Dams in Virginia
Buildings and structures in Alleghany County, Virginia
Embankment dams
United States Army Corps of Engineers dams
Dams completed in 1979
Moomaw
George Washington and Jefferson National Forests
Bodies of water of Alleghany County, Virginia
Bodies of water of Bath County, Virginia